Hoathly may refer to:

East Hoathly with Halland, a village and hamlet in East Sussex, England
West Hoathly, a village in West Sussex, England